Romeo Ranjha is a 2014 Punjabi language Indian action comedy film starring Jazzy B and Garry Sandhu written by Dheeraj Ratan, directed by Navaniat Singh, who also directed Singh vs Kaur. Romeo Ranjha is produced by Gunbir Singh Sidhu and Manmord Sidhu with Hansraj Railhan as co-producer. Allan Amin directed the action sequences.

Synopsis
Punjabis Romeo (Jazzy B) and Ranjha (Garry Sandhu) meet each other while working in Thailand. Ranjha falls in love with a girl named Preet who runs a refugee camp with the help of her uncle. The uncle says that he may only marry Preet only if he makes a large donation to help the refugees. Ranjha secretly gives a large sum that belongs equally to Romeo. It transpires that Preet and her uncle are tricksters who have returned to the Punjab and previously duped Romeo out of money.

Cast

 Jazzy B as Romeo 
 Garry Sandhu as Ranjha
 Monica Bedi as DSP Reet Kaur 
 Parul Gulati as Preet
 Rana Ranbir as Slaty
 Yograj Singh as Rancho
 Rana Jung Bahadur
 Sangha Jagir
 Gopi Bhalla

References

External links
 

2014 films
Indian action comedy films
2014 action comedy films
Punjabi-language Indian films
2010s Punjabi-language films
Films scored by Jatinder Shah
2014 comedy films